Manuel Guzmán Flores (born October 13, 1969) is a former international backstroke and freestyle swimmer from Puerto Rico, who participated in two consecutive Summer Olympics for his native country, starting in 1988. His best result was a 12th place in the Men's 4 × 100 m Freestyle Relay at the 1992 Summer Olympics in Barcelona, Spain. He graduated from Bloomington High School South in 1989 where he was an individual state champion and helped lead the team to a state runner-up finish.

References

1969 births
Living people
Puerto Rican male swimmers
Puerto Rican male freestyle swimmers
Male backstroke swimmers
Swimmers at the 1987 Pan American Games
Swimmers at the 1988 Summer Olympics
Swimmers at the 1991 Pan American Games
Swimmers at the 1992 Summer Olympics
Olympic swimmers of Puerto Rico
Pan American Games bronze medalists for Puerto Rico
Pan American Games medalists in swimming
Central American and Caribbean Games gold medalists for Puerto Rico
Competitors at the 1990 Central American and Caribbean Games
Central American and Caribbean Games medalists in swimming
Medalists at the 1991 Pan American Games
20th-century Puerto Rican people